Ely Bielutin (Eliy Mikhailovich Belyutin) – (10 June 1925, Moscow – 27 February 2012, Moscow) was a Russian visual artist and art theoretician, the founder of The New Reality artistic academy.

Bielutin graduated from the Surikov Moscow Art Institute where he studied under representatives of the Russian avant-garde such as Aristarch Lentulov and Pavel Kuznetsov. In 1948 Bielutin founded “The New Reality” artistic academy. In 1964 he relocated the academy to Abramtsevo, in the outskirts of Moscow. In 1962, a comprehensive exhibition to commemorate the 30th anniversary of the Moscow Union of Artists was held at the Central Exhibition Hall (Manez). The works of Bielutin's disciples constituted a large part of the exhibition. The General Secretary of the Communist Party of the Soviet Union Nikita Khrushchev severely criticized the exhibition and as a result it was dismantled. This event marked the end of the period of liberal reforms ranging from agriculture to foreign policy collectively known as the Khrushchev Thaw.

In 1991, a large retrospective of the artists-members of the New Reality School took place in Manez with a comprehensive catalogue published on the occasion of the exhibition.

Ely Bielutin was one of the first exponents of Russian abstract art. Having gone through quasi-Expressionist period (Lenin’s Funeral, 1962, The State Tretyakov Gallery, Moscow), the artist developed his own version of abstract idiom (module painting) partially influenced by Western abstract paintings he saw during the exhibition in Moscow in 1957. According to Beliutin’s “Theory of Universal Contact” (he published an eponymous book in 1991), art is the means of bringing the state of balance into the relationship of man and nature.

Ely Bielutin died on 27 February 2012 at the age of 86.

Museums and public collections
Jane Voorhees Zimmerli Art Museum, The Norton and Nancy Dodge Collection of Soviet Nonconformist Art (1956–1986), Rutgers University, New Brunswick, New Jersey
Rose Art Museum, Brandeis University, Waltham, Massachusetts
The State Russian Museum, St. Petersburg
The State Tretyakov Gallery, Moscow
Moscow Museum of Modern Art
The State Historical Museum, Moscow
The Centre Georges Pompidou, Paris

References

External links
Ely Bielutin's profile at Mimi Ferzt Gallery web-site https://web.archive.org/web/20110903093521/http://www.mimiferzt.com/#/ely_bielutin

Literature
Nadine Shenkar: Ely Bielutin. Ed. SPIRALI/VEL. Milano. 2003. ISBN 5-902782-04-X

See also
Soviet art

20th-century Russian painters
Russian male painters
21st-century Russian painters
1925 births
2012 deaths
Russian contemporary artists
20th-century Russian male artists
21st-century Russian male artists